"Unsatisfied" is a 1984 song by American rock band the Replacements.

Unsatisfied may also refer to:

"Unsatisfied", a song by The Copyrights from Make Sound
"Unsatisfied", a song by Waylon Jennings from Good Hearted Woman
"Unsatisfied", a song by Nine Black Alps from Everything Is
"Unsatisfied", a song by Pulling Teeth from Paranoid Delusions/Paradise Illusions